Maneri is a town in Uttarakhand, India. Situated on the banks of river Bhagirathi 8 km north of Uttarkashi, it is the home of Maneri Dam and the terminating railway station on Chota Char Dham Railway nearest to Gangotri.

Geography
Maneri is located nearby Yamuna and Ganges (Bhagirathi) rivers, originating at Yamunotri and Gangotri (Gomukh) respectively.

Demographics
 India census, Maneri village has 299 families with a total population of 1271, of which 697 are males while 574 are females.

Places of interest

 Dodital: One of the popular fresh water lake in Uttarkashi. 21 km trek to Dodital starts from Sangamchatti.
 Tiloth Power Plant
 Maneri Dam
 Bhali Dam
 Nachiketa Tal
 Kuteti Devi temple
 Gyansu and Palla Gyansu
 Joshiyara
 Matli
 Mahidanda

Adventure sports
White water rafting
Trekking tracks
Mountaineering

See also
1991 Uttarkashi earthquake

References

External links
Uttarkashi district, Official website
Uttarkashi district Tourism
Resort in Uttarkashi

Cities and towns in Uttarkashi district